Fenestrulina is a genus within the bryozoan order Cheilostomatida. It is the only member of the family Fenestrulinidae. It has a world-wide distribution.

Species
As accepted by GBIF;

Fenestrulina ampla 
Fenestrulina amplissima 
Fenestrulina antarctica 
Fenestrulina asperula 
Fenestrulina asturiasensis 
Fenestrulina barrosoi 
Fenestrulina blaggae 
Fenestrulina bullata 
Fenestrulina candida 
Fenestrulina caseola 
Fenestrulina catastictos 
Fenestrulina cervicornis 
Fenestrulina commensalis 
Fenestrulina constellata 
Fenestrulina cornuta 
Fenestrulina crystallina 
Fenestrulina curviscutum 
Fenestrulina delicia 
Fenestrulina dictyota 
Fenestrulina diplopunctata 
Fenestrulina disjuncta 
Fenestrulina dupla 
Fenestrulina elevora 
Fenestrulina eopacifica 
Fenestrulina epiphytica 
Fenestrulina exigua 
Fenestrulina fahimii 
Fenestrulina farnsworthi 
Fenestrulina fritilla 
Fenestrulina gelasinoides 
Fenestrulina harmelini 
Fenestrulina harmeri 
Fenestrulina horrida 
Fenestrulina incompta 
Fenestrulina incusa 
Fenestrulina indigena 
Fenestrulina inesae 
Fenestrulina infundibulipora 
Fenestrulina irregularis 
Fenestrulina jocunda 
Fenestrulina juani 
Fenestrulina littoralis 
Fenestrulina majuscula 
Fenestrulina malusii 
Fenestrulina marioni 
Fenestrulina microstoma 
Fenestrulina miramara 
Fenestrulina morrisae 
Fenestrulina multicava 
Fenestrulina multiflorum 
Fenestrulina mutabilis 
Fenestrulina napierensis 
Fenestrulina orientalis 
Fenestrulina parvipora 
Fenestrulina pauciporosa 
Fenestrulina personata 
Fenestrulina porosa 
Fenestrulina proxima 
Fenestrulina pulchra 
Fenestrulina pumicosa 
Fenestrulina reticularis 
Fenestrulina reticulata 
Fenestrulina rugula 
Fenestrulina sinica 
Fenestrulina specca 
Fenestrulina thyreophora 
Fenestrulina tongassorum 
Fenestrulina umbonata 
Fenestrulina vivianii

References

Bryozoan genera
Cheilostomatida
Extant Miocene first appearances